The 1978 South African Grand Prix (formally the XXIV Citizen and Asseng Grand Prix of South Africa) was a Formula One motor race held on 4 March 1978 at Kyalami. This was the debut race of the future world champion Keke Rosberg.

Both the Ferrari (312T3) and Brabham (BT46) teams had new cars in Kyalami for the race. The event also saw the return of Renault with their unique turbocharged car.

Summary
Ronnie Peterson, in the Lotus 78 with its Colin Chapman-inspired ground effect aerodynamics, battled Patrick Depailler in his Tyrrell on the last lap to take a dramatic victory. John Watson finished third for Brabham. Young Italian, Riccardo Patrese got his Arrows into the lead before retiring with a blown engine. Pole sitter and reigning world champion Niki Lauda, in his first season with Brabham, retired with engine failure and the Ferraris of Carlos Reutemann and Gilles Villeneuve exited on lap 55. James Hunt, who had qualified third on the grid in his McLaren M26, only lasted five laps when his engine failed, whilst his new teammate Patrick Tambay, who qualified fourth, crashed out mid race.

Classification

Qualifying

*Positions in red indicate entries that failed to qualify.

Race

Championship standings after the race 

Drivers' Championship standings

Constructors' Championship standings

Note: Only the top five positions are included for both sets of standings.

References

South African Grand Prix
South African Grand Prix
Grand Prix
South African Grand Prix